is a city located in the western part of Saga Prefecture on the island of Kyushu, Japan.

The modern city of Ureshino was formed on January 1, 2006, by the merger of the former town of Ureshino, absorbing the town of Shiota (both from Fujitsu District). Ureshino is locally known for the green tea grown there and its hot spring resorts.

Adjoining municipalities
Saga Prefecture
Kashima
Takeo
Shiroishi
Nagasaki Prefecture
Hasami
Higashisonogi
Kawatana
Ōmura

History
1889-04-01 – The modern municipal system was established. The current city region is occupied by 6 villages (Gochōda, Higashiureshino, Kuma, Nishiureshino, Shiota and Yoshida).
1918-10-05 – Shiota was elevated to town status.
1929-04-22 – Nishiureshino was elevated to town status and was renamed Ureshino.
1933-04-01 – Higashiureshino was incorporated into Ureshino.
1955-04-01 – Yoshida was incorporated into Ureshino.
1956-09-01 – Gochōda and Kuma were incorporated into Shiota.
2006-01-01 – Ureshino absorbed Shiota to create Ureshino City.

Geography

Climate

Education

Prefectural senior high schools
Shiota Technical Senior High School
Ureshino Senior High School

Municipal junior high schools
Ōnohara Junior High School
Shiota Junior High School
Ureshino Junior High School
Yoshida Junior High School

Municipal elementary schools
Gochōda Elementary School
Kuma Elementary School
Ōkusano Elementary School
Ōnohara Elementary School
Shiota Elementary School
Todoroki Elementary School
Ureshino Elementary School
Yoshida Elementary School

Transport

Air
The closest airports are Nagasaki Airport and Saga Airport.

Rail
Previously, the closest railway stations were Hizen-Kashima Station in Kashima and Takeo-Onsen Station in Takeo.

Road
Expressways:
Nagasaki Expressway 
Ureshino Interchange
National highways:
Route 34
Route 498
Prefectural roads: 
Sasebo-Ureshino Route 1
Ōmura-Ureshino Route 6
Ureshino-Shiota Route 28
Kashima-Ureshino Route 41
Ureshino-Yamauchi Route 45

Places and items of interest

Hizen Yume Kaidō

This amusement park is a reproduction of a town along the Nagasaki Kaidō, a major route which ran through the region in the 17th century during the Edo period.  There are dramatic shows that include samurai, ninjas and princesses, shown on the weekends.

Ureshino Spa
The city boasts some of the region's best onsen, including Shibasansou, Taishoya, and Warakuen. There are currently over 40 spas in the area, both indoor and outdoor, ranging in size and water quality.  Tourists may purchase a discount spa ticket from the local Tourist Information Office, located at the Ureshino Highway Interchange.

Ureshino Onsen Tofu
Onsen water is used to make this delightful local dish.  The alkaline in the water makes the bean curd in the tofu soft and mellow when it is heated in ceramic pots.  Onsen tofu is traditionally served with condiments such as green onion, ginger, and sesame paste to taste.

Ureshino green tea

Ureshino is an area surrounded by green tea fields, and is well known as one of the best green tea producers in Japan, as the method of tea production dates back to 1504, when it was first introduced from China during the Ming dynasty.  This tradition has been carried on today in the delicate aroma and flavour of the tea.

Festivals and events

January
Takeo Onsen Health Road Race (嬉野温泉健康ロードレース大会)

February
Ureshino Attaka Festival (うれしのあったかまつり)

April
Ureshino Tea Mitto (うれしの茶ミット)
Oyama-san Festival (お山さんまつり)

August
Happy Carnival (うれしカーニバル)
Takeo Onsen Summer Festival (嬉野温泉夏まつり)

November
Hachiman Shrine Festival (八幡宮例祭)
Tanjō Shrine Shiota Kunchi (丹生神社例祭塩田くんち)

December
Hachiten Shrine Grand Festival (八天神社例大祭)

References

External links 

 Ureshino City official website 

Spa towns in Japan
Cities in Saga Prefecture